Karol Pazurek (17 December 1905 – 6 January 1945) was a Polish footballer. He played in 16 matches for the Poland national football team from 1927 to 1935.

References

External links
 

1905 births
1945 deaths
Polish footballers
Poland international footballers
Place of birth missing
Association footballers not categorized by position